Lois Ann Fairley, RN (July 6, 1931 – July 19, 2007) was a Canadian nurse, a patient care advocate, an Ontario labour leader, and a community service activist.

Personal life
Lois Ann Fairley was born on July 6, 1931 in Toronto, Ontario, Canada to James Alexander Cowan, and Grace Fenwick Williams. She was the granddaughter of the Canadian Presbyterian minister and historian, Hugh Cowan.

She was also the granddaughter of Canadian journalist and historian, Fred Williams; the great-granddaughter of the Victorian era war correspondent, writer, and newspaper editor Charles Williams; and the niece of Olympic athlete John Fitzpatrick.

She graduated as a registered nurse at the Grace Hospital and worked there from 1955 until her retirement in 1993. She married Henry William Grant Fairley, a Windsor police officer, on June 25, 1955.

Career

Nursing
Fairley worked as a registered nurse in her 38 years of nursing career at the Grace Hospital in Windsor, Ontario, Canada from 1955 to 1993. Grace Hospital was founded as a general hospital in 1920. It was closed in 1996 and merged with Hotel-Dieu Hospital.

Fairley was noted by her colleagues with her ongoing support for nurses. She was said to be “the heart and soul of nursing in Windsor.” She served as a head nurse for various departments in Grace hospital and acted as mentor to student nurses from St. Clair College and The University of Windsor nursing programmes, and was vocal about the workplace issues such as salary and benefits she knew nurses deserved. She was a founding member of the Ontario Nurses Association October 13, 1973. In October 1975, Bernice Hicks became the President and Fairley was elected as the Ontario Nurses Association President-elect. In November 1976, Lois Fairley became President of the Ontario Nurses Association. In January 1977, the Ontario Nurses Association and the Ontario Hospital Association agree that "province-wide bargaining is desirable."  During her presidency, the pivotal declaration on the importance of nurses in patient care is released. The ONA Health Review is entitled "Let Us Take Care" and achieves widespread and positive media coverage for nurses in the profession. 120,000 copies are distributed in the first-printing. "The public and media respond with calls with more money for mental health programs, a halt to the decline in health care and an end to abuse in hospitals." Nursing gains a positive reputation in the public. Her term is ended in November 1977 and she is replaced by the next Ontario Nurses Association President Sharon Thompson. Fairley also served as a member of the Board of Directors of the Registered Nurses' Association of Ontario. She served from 1984 to 1986 as the RNAO member-at-large for socio-economic welfare.  She also championed "Project Turnabout", a support group to help nurses struggling with drug and alcohol addiction.

Others
She was also involved in a number of charitable and community fund-raising and support programs in Windsor and Essex county including hospice. A room in the Windsor-Essex County Hospice Village is named in her honour. Some of her summers were shared serving children as the camp nurse Forest Cliff Camp, Forest, Ontario where her camp nickname was "Shots."

Recognition
Following her death in 2007, an award for nurses was named after her, the Lois A. Fairley Nurse of the Year Community Service Award. The award was given to nurses in Windsor and Essex area in recognition for the care and compassion to patients, and contributions to the field of nursing. The award is given by the Windsor – Essex Chapter of the Registered Nurses' Association of Ontario.

Death
She died at the age of 76 on July 19, 2007 at the Hospice Village in Windsor, Ontario, Canada after succumbing to cancer. Her resting place is at the Greenlawn Memorial Gardens in Oldcastle, Ontario.

References

1932 births
2007 deaths
Canadian nurses
Canadian women nurses
Deaths from cancer in Ontario
People from Toronto
People from Windsor, Ontario